The Genie Award for Best Theatrical Short Film was a Canadian film award, historically presented by the Academy of Canadian Cinema and Television through its Genie Awards program to a film judged as the year's best short film. The award has been inclusive of short films in the live action drama, animated and documentary genres.

Originally presented by the Canadian Film Awards from their creation in 1949, the award was presented annually until 1964 with the exceptions of 1955, when an honourable mention was given but no formal winner was named, and 1957, when the award was not presented. The award was then not presented in 1965, 1966 or 1967.

Beginning in 1968, the Canadian Film Awards instituted separate award categories for "Film Over 30 Minutes" and "Film Under 30 Minutes". This continued for three years until 1971, when the single award for Best Theatrical Short was reinstituted. Except for 1974, when the Canadian Film Awards were entirely cancelled, the award was presented continuously thereafter until the Canadian Film Awards evolved into the Genie Awards in 1980, and continued to be presented in the early years of the Genie Awards.

After 1985, however, the Academy's presentation of the award varied from year to year, with a single award for Best Theatrical Short presented in some years, while separate awards for Best Live Action Short Drama, Best Animated Short and Best Short Documentary were presented in others. This variability continued until the 17th Genie Awards in 1996; since then, the separate genre categories have been consistently presented at all subsequent Genie or Canadian Screen Award ceremonies, and the Best Theatrical Short category is no longer in use.

1940s

1950s

1960s

1970s

1980s

1990s

References

Genie Awards

Theatrical short